Maria Reining (August 7, 1903 in Vienna – March 11, 1991 in Deggendorf) was an Austrian soprano, honored with the title Kammersängerin.

At first, Reining worked as in a Viennese bank, and didn't commence her singing career until the age of 28, when she started to sing at the Vienna State Opera, mainly in soubrette roles. Two years later, she moved to Darmstadt, then to the Munich State Opera, where she made her debut as Elsa in Lohengrin, under Hans Knappertsbusch. In 1937 she followed Knappertsbusch to the Vienna State Opera, where she sang Elsa again.

Reining was a member of the Vienna State Opera ensemble between 1931 and 1933 and again between 1937 and 1957. Between 1937 and 1941, she sang at the Salzburg Festival with great success, conducted, among others, by Arturo Toscanini.

She predominantly sang roles by Mozart, Wagner and Richard Strauss. As a guest, she appeared at the leading European opera houses: among others, she sang at the Royal Opera House in London and at La Scala in Milan. Reining also appeared as Ariadne and the Marschallin at New York City Opera.

Reining died in 1991 in the Lower Bavarian town of Deggendorf and was buried in Dornbach in Vienna.

There are a number of recordings of Reining: her Arabella (Salzburg, 1947, under Karl Böhm), Daphne (Vienna, 1944, Böhm), Ariadne (Vienna, 1944, Böhm), Eva in Die Meistersinger (Vienna, 1937, Toscanini), Marschallin in Der Rosenkavalier (Salzburg, 1949, George Szell; Salzburg, 1953, Clemens Krauss; Vienna, 1954 (Studio), Erich Kleiber; Vienna, 1955, Knappertsbusch) are all on disc. Reining also recorded the last scene of Die Walküre Act 1 with Max Lorenz as Siegmund in Berlin in 1941 for Deutsche Schallplatten, conducted by Artur Rother: a fast-paced account full of energy and passion, and with impeccable diction from both singers. Reining recorded several Richard Strauss songs with the composer at the piano in Vienna during 1942, including Zueignung, Traum durch die Dämmerung and Cäcilie.

Selected filmography
 Vienna Blood (1942)

Sources
Most of the information in this article is taken from the German Wikipedia article.

External links
 Maria Reining sings  from "Eva by Franz Lehar":

1903 births
1991 deaths
Austrian operatic sopranos
Musicians from Vienna
Österreichischer Kammersänger
20th-century Austrian women opera singers